Saint-Charles is a civil parish in Kent County, New Brunswick, Canada.

For governance purposes most of the parish is part of the town of Beaurivage, with a small area on the south part of the village of Five Rivers, both of which members of the Kent Regional Service Commission. 

Prior to the 2023 governance reform, the parish was divided between the local service districts of Aldouane and the parish of Saint-Charles.

Origin of name
The parish may take its name from the Roman Catholic ecclesiastical parish of Saint-Charles-Borromée.

History
Saint-Charles was erected in 1909 from parts of Richibucto and Saint-Louis Parishes. The new parish included settlements along the Saint-Charles River, which formed the boundary between Richibucto and Saint-Louis.

Boundaries
Saint-Charles Parish is bounded:

on the west and north by a line beginning where the Canadian National Railway crosses the northern line of Weldford Parish, which runs due west from the northernmost corner of the Richibucto 15 Indian reserve, and running northeasterly to the rear line of a grant on the Kouchibouguacis River, then generally easterly along the rear of grants along the river to the rear line of grants along the Saint-Charles River, near Route 134, and the prolongation of the rear line of the Saint-Charles River grants northeasterly to Saint-Louis Bay, then out through the gully near Terre-Noire Point and Kouchibouguac Bay to Northumberland Strait;
on the east by Northumberland Strait;
on the southeast by a line through Richibucto Harbour and up Northwest Branch to the mouth of Thomas Brook, then northwesterly to the northern line of a grant on the northern line of the town of Richibucto, then southwesterly along the grant to its westernmost corner, about midway between Route 11 and Route 134, and from there southwest to the northern line of Weldford Parish, near Aldouane Station Cross Road;
on the south by the northern line of Weldford Parish.

Communities
Communities at least partly within the parish; italics indicate a name no longer in official use

Aldouane
Aldouane Station
Grande-Aldouane
Kent Lake
Kent Lake Siding

Lower Saint-Charles
Petite-Aldouane
Saint-Charles
Saint-Charles-Nord
Saint-Ignace Siding

Bodies of water
Bodies of water at least partly in the parish:

Petite rivière Aldouane
Rivière aux Masquis
Molus River
Saint-Charles River
Northwest Branch
Jardine Lake
Kent Lake

Le Barachois
Northumberland Strait
Kouchibouguac Bay
Baie de Saint-Louis
Richibucto Harbour
Richibucto Gully

Conservation areas
Parks, historic sites, and related entities in the parish.
Kouchibouguac National Park

Demographics

Population
Population trend

Language
Mother tongue (2016)

See also
List of parishes in New Brunswick

Notes

References

Parishes of Kent County, New Brunswick